Tuson is a surname of British origin. It may refer to:

Chris Tuson (born 1988), British rugby league player
Henry Tuson (1836–1916), British general
John Tuson Bennett (1937–2013), Australian lawyer

See also
Tucson, Arizona
Tucson (disambiguation)

Surnames
English-language surnames